Moldova national football team results may refer to:

 Moldova national football team results (1991–1999), for the list of results between 1991 and 1999
 Moldova national football team results (2000–2009), for the list of results between 2000 and 2009
 Moldova national football team results (2010–2019), for the list of results between 2010 and 2019
 Moldova national football team results (2020–present), for the list of results since 2020

Lists of sports lists
Moldova national football team results